Australoechemus celer is a species of ground spider of the family Gnaphosidae that is endemic in Cape Verde. The species was first described by Günter E. W. Schmidt and Friedhelm Piepho in 1994. It occurs on the islands of Sal and Santiago.

Description
The male holotype measures about 5 mm.

References

Gnaphosidae
Spiders of Africa
Taxa named by Günter E. W. Schmidt
Taxa named by Friedhelm Piepho
Arthropods of Cape Verde
Endemic fauna of Cape Verde
Spiders described in 1994